Aeschrostoma is a monotypic moth genus in the family Geometridae. It has a single species, Aeschrostoma marmorata, known from New Guinea. Both the genus and species were described by Warren in 1903.

References

Larentiinae
Geometridae genera
Monotypic moth genera